Marlous Pieëte (born 19 July 1989, in Naarden) is a Dutch female retired footballer who played either as a midfielder or as a striker for Western Sydney Wanderers in the Australian W-League and international football for the Netherlands women's national football team.

Club career 

Pieëte began her career as a junior with VVOG, she progressed through the teams (from team E1 to B1) only leaving to join Be Quick '28 who were at the time playing at the highest level of women's football in the Netherlands.

When the Dutch women's professional league (Eredivisie) was launched in 2007, Pieëte joined FC Twente. At the end of her seven seasons with the club, she had won many titles (Eredivisie, BeNe League and Dutch Cup) as well as played in the UEFA Women's Champions League.

In 2014, Pieëte moved to Ajax and played three seasons at the club, winning the Eredivisie and Cup titles in her last season at the club.

Pieëte joined Australian W-League team Western Sydney Wanderers ahead of the 2017–18 season.

In March 2018, Pieëte retired from football.

International career 
Pieëte represented the Netherlands at Under-17 and Under-19 level. She made her debut for the Netherlands senior team on 5 March 2009 against Russia in the 2009 Cyprus Cup. She was selected for the 2009 European Championships squad, playing three times and scoring in the semi-final as the Netherlands lost to England.

In June 2013 national team coach Roger Reijners selected Pieëte in the final Netherlands squad for UEFA Women's Euro 2013 in Sweden, but sustained a knee injury on the eve of the tournament and was ruled out of the tournament.

International goals 
Scores and results list the Netherlands goal tally first.

Honours 
Twente
 BeNe League (2): 2012–13, 2013–14
 Eredivisie (3): 2010–11, 2012–13*, 2013–14*
 KNVB Women's Cup (1): 2007–08
*During the BeNe League period (2012 to 2015), the highest placed Dutch team is considered as national champion by the Royal Dutch Football Association.

Ajax
 Eredivisie (1): 2016–17
 KNVB Women's Cup (1): 2016–17

References 

1989 births
Living people
People from Naarden
Dutch women's footballers
Netherlands women's international footballers
Dutch expatriate sportspeople in Australia
Expatriate women's soccer players in Australia
FC Twente (women) players
AFC Ajax (women) players
Western Sydney Wanderers FC (A-League Women) players
Eredivisie (women) players
A-League Women players
Women's association football midfielders
Women's association football forwards
Dutch expatriate women's footballers
Footballers from North Holland